The 2021 European Cross Country Championships was the 27th edition of the cross country running competition for European athletes. It was held on 12 December 2021 in Dublin, Ireland.

Medal summary

Medal table

References

European Cross Country Championships
European Cross Country Championships
European Cross Country Championships
European Cross Country Championships